The Izki is a river in Álava, Basque Country, Spain. It is a tributary of the Ega river, itself a tributary of the Ebro. Most of its course is located within the Izki Natural Park. The river is part of the Ega-Berron Special Area of Conservation. It is home to a population of European mink, a critically endangered species. The Eurasian otter is also present.

Course 

The most common rock type in the basin is sandstone, and most of it is covered by forests. Most tributaries of the Izki river are short streams. After the gorge, the river reaches a wide alluvial plain where it converges with the Ega. In the summer, the dry season can be very marked, with some sections of the river and its tributaries drying out.

The small Aranbaltza dam is located in the gorge. The water from the reservoir is used (with an elevation difference of around ) to power a small hydroelectric plant in Antoñana. The plant was built in 1905 and put back into operation in 2015.

References

External links
 

Rivers of Spain
Rivers of the Basque Country (autonomous community)
Rivers of Álava
Ebro basin
Natura 2000 in the Basque Country (autonomous community)